King's Highway15, commonly referred to as Highway15, is a provincially maintained highway in the Canadian province of Ontario. In addition to Kingston and Carleton Place, the highway provides access to the Eastern Ontario communities of Joyceville, Seeley's Bay, Morton, Elgin, Crosby, Portland, Lombardy and Franktown. Prior to 1998, Highway15 continued north from Carleton Place, passed Almonte and through Pakenham, to Highway 17 in Arnprior.

Highway15 was one of the original highways created by the province in 1920 to establish a highway network and qualify for funding under the Canada Highways Act. The southern terminus, originally in Seeley's Bay, was moved to Highway 2 in Kingston the following year. While the northern terminus has shifted numerous times, the southern terminus has consistently remained in Kingston since 1921. Initially, Highway15 connected Smiths Falls with Carleton Place via Perth. The assignment of the Trans-Canada Highway during the 1950s led to a major renumbering scheme in 1961 that redirected the highway concurrent with Highway 29 via Franktown.

Although realignments and bypasses have been constructed around many of the towns along the route, it continues to serve as a major corridor between Kingston and Ottawa. While the distance between the two is approximately  shorter via Highway15, Highway401 and Highway 416 provide a quicker travel time.

Route description 
Highway15 is a  route that connects Kingston with Carleton Place. A  segment of the highway, within the town limits of Smiths Falls, is maintained under a Connecting Link agreement.
It passes through Frontenac County, the United Counties of Leeds and Grenville and Lanark County along its route through Eastern Ontario. On an average day in 2016, 2,850vehicles used the highway between Morton and Crosby, while 9,400vehicles used it south of Carleton Place, the least and most trafficked sections of the route, respectively.

Highway15 begins at an interchange with Highway401 (Exit623) in the city of Kingston; it once continued south to former Highway2, next to CFB Kingston in Barriefield, but this section is now Kingston Road 15. The route travels northeast alongside the Cataraqui River, slicing through Joyceville and passing Joyceville Institution. Over the next several kilometres, the route travels alongside the Rideau Canal, with Locks 43, 44 and 45 a short drive off the highway. After leaving Frontenac and entering Leeds and Grenville, the route encounters Seeleys Bay, where it curves east and soon meets the northern terminus of former Highway 32. It turns north, then crosses between the municipalities of Leeds and the Thousand Islands and Rideau Lakes at the community of Morton.

After turning northwest and bypassing the community of Elgin, the route encounters the community of Crosby, intersecting former Highway 42 and curving northeast. For the next , the highway travels alongside the Cataraqui Trail, a former Canadian National Railway line donated in 1997 to become a mixed use trail.
It passes through the communities of Portland and Lombardy before entering Smiths Falls and Lanark County, where it intersects former Highway29 and Highway 43 and turns north. The route crosses the Rideau Canal and proceeds towards Carleton Place alongside the Ottawa Valley Railway, bisecting the communities of Franktown, Beckwith and Black's Corners. On the southern outskirts of Carleton Place, Highway15 ends at an intersection with Highway7 just west of where it becomes a freeway.

History

Provincial highway 

Highway15 is one of the original provincial highways created by the Department of Public Highways, predecessor to the Ministry of Transportation of Ontario (MTO), in order to qualify for funding under the Canada Highways Act. On October13, 1920, several dirt roads through the United Counties of Leeds and Grenville and Lanark County, which would later become Highway15, were designated as part of the rapidly expanding Provincial Highway Network. The route began in the community of Seeley's Bay and followed the current routing north to Smiths Falls. From there it travelled west to Perth, then arced northeast towards Carleton Place. The highway passed through that town and winded towards Ottawa, following roughly the same alignment as Highway7 does today.
The following year, the highway was extended south from Seeley's Bay into Kingston to end at Highway2.

Initially unnumbered, the route was designated as Highway15 during the summer of 1925.
By that point, the southern terminus was at the present junction of James Street (then Highway2) and Main Street in Barriefield, north of Fort Henry.
The northern segment of Highway15 – approaching and within Ottawa – changed throughout the years, and varies between maps; most indicate that the intersection of Bank Street and Wellington Street served as the northern terminus of Highways15, 16, and 31.
Confederation Square, then known as Connaught Place, was originally planned to serve as the terminus of Ottawa-bound highways when route numbers were posted there in September 1925.

Between Carleton Place and Ottawa, Highway15 initially followed a circuitous route that served the villages of Ashton and Stittsville. It followed the present-day roads of Highway7 east from Carleton Place, south on Ashton Station Road to Ormrod Road, then east along Flewellyn Road to Stittsville Main Street. It turned north through Stittsville, onto McCooeye Lane, then east onto Neil Avenue and thence Hazeldean Road. It followed Hazeldean Road as it transitioned to Robertson Road at Eagleson Corners.
Entering Ottawa along Robertson Road and Richmond Road, it converged with Highway17 along Carling Avenue; Highway16 also became concurrent with the pair east of Preston Street. All three highways continued west to Highway 31 (Bank Street), which they turned onto and followed together north to Wellington Street.

Rerouting 
Outside of Ottawa, Highway15 has undergone several significant changes throughout its history. While the southern end has consistently been within Kingston, the segment north of Smiths Falls has shifted several times, notably in 1961 and 1983. Both changes relate to the history of Highway 29 — designated in 1927 to connect Brockville with Ottawa — and the Trans-Canada Highway Act. Highway29 was discontinuous at first, with a gap between Smiths Falls and Carleton Place; Highway15 provided the only connection between the two.
The gap was removed on August5, 1936, when the Franktown Road was assumed by the Department of Highways (DHO).
Prior to the early 1930s, Highway7 did not extend east of Peterborough. A depression-relief project to build a new road between Madoc and Perth was completed on August23, 1932.

Construction of the Carleton Place Bypass began in the spring of 1958, with the aim of rerouting traffic out of the downtown area. Prior to its completion, Highway15 entered Carleton Place along High Street, turning south onto Bridge Street, and along Moore Street and Franktown Road to the junction with Highway29.
The bypass, which included a bridge over the Mississippi River and an overpass of what is now the Ottawa Valley Railway, was designated as part of Highway15 on November19, 1959.
It opened several weeks later in early December as an unpaved route. Paving of the bypass took place the following spring.

When the Trans-Canada Highway Act was passed in 1949, Ontario chose to utilise the availed federal funding to create what is now known as the Central Ontario route, via Highway7. As a result, travel characteristics, and the numbering of Highway15 between Perth and Ottawa, led to confusion among motorists. The Ottawa Board of Trade petitioned the DHO to renumber several highways surrounding the city to accommodate long-distance travellers.
The DHO performed a series of renumberings, similar to those recommendations, following the extension of Highway 43 on September8, 1961. Highway15 was rerouted between Smiths Falls and Carleton Place to travel concurrently with Highway29; Highway7 was extended along the former routing from Perth to Carleton Place and signed concurrently with Highway15 eastward to Ottawa, and Highway43 was routed between Smiths Falls and Perth.

In 1969, a bypass of Barriefield was built, redirecting both Highway15 and Highway2 around the historic village.
During the early 1980s, Highway29 was truncated at Smiths Falls, while the Highway15 designation was retained along the section of Highway29 between Carleton Place and Arnprior. This change was approved by the provincial government in 1983, without consulting local governments; signage changes were made in the spring of 1984.
Highway15 thereafter remained as the sole route connecting Smiths Falls with Carleton Place, Almonte, and Arnprior.

Downloads 
As part of a series of budget cuts initiated by premier Mike Harris under his Common Sense Revolution platform in 1995, numerous highways deemed to no longer be of significance to the provincial network were decommissioned, and responsibility for the routes transferred to a lower level of government, a process referred to as downloading. The segment of Highway15 north of Highway7 was downloaded in its entirety on January1, 1998, and transferred to the various local governments through which it travelled.

Major intersections

Notes

References

External links 

Highway 15 – Length and Route
Highway 15 – Pictures and Information

015
Carleton Place
Transport in Kingston, Ontario